Belmont University College of Law is a private law school in Nashville, Tennessee. Founded in 2011, the College of Law was accredited by the American Bar Association in 2013, the earliest possible time allowed by accreditation guidelines.

History 
Belmont University announced plans for the College of Law in 2009, with the first class beginning in 2011. Belmont Law was accredited by the American Bar Association in 2013, making it the first new accredited law program in Tennessee in more than 50 years  and the first new law school in Middle Tennessee in nearly 100 years. Belmont Law achieved American Bar Association accreditation in the earliest possible time allowed by accreditation guidelines.

Curriculum 
The college's curriculum includes the Juris Doctor (J.D.) with specialized certificate programs available in Criminal Law, Health Law, and Entertainment Law. The College of Law curriculum focuses on creating practice-ready attorneys with a practicum requirement in each semester to help students become proficient in the “practice” of law. These practicums give instruction in all aspects of the practice of law, such as legal writing, legal research, client interviewing, document drafting, litigation, negotiation, and more.

In 2017, a dual JD/MBA program was launched, allowing students to take classes for both degrees concurrently and complete requirements for both degrees within three years.

Facilities 

The law school is located in the Randall and Sadie Baskin Center building, a 75,000-square-foot LEED Gold building atop a five-level underground garage. The Randall and Sadie Baskin Center houses more than a dozen large classrooms, a trial courtroom, an appellate court room, faculty offices, student commons, and a two-story law library.

Organizations and Publications 
Students can participate in local and national competitions through the Board of Advocates program, which includes mock-trial, moot-court, and transactional teams.

The College of Law publishes four academic journals, the Belmont Law Review, Criminal Law Journal, Entertainment Law Journal, and Health Law Journal.

Employment 
Statistics for the class of 2018 indicate 96% of students are employed in some capacity, with 95% employed in bar-passage-required or J.D.–advantage positions. Most graduates remain in state, with 89% employed in Tennessee. Of those employed, 63% work at a law firm, 14.5% work in business or industry, 18.5% work in government or judicial clerkships, and 4% work in public interest.

Belmont Law's Law School Transparency under-employment score is 6.4%, which reflects the percentage of the Class of 2018 that is unemployed, pursuing an additional degree, or working in a nonprofessional, short-term, or part-time job nine months after graduation.

Bar Passage 
On the July 2019 bar exam, 97.18% of Belmont Law's first-time test takers and 94.52% of its total takers passed, the highest of any law school in Tennessee and 23.62% higher than Tennessee's 70.90% pass rate. In 2018, 94.52% of Belmont Law's first-time test takers and 90.79% of its total takers passed the bar exam, ranking 12th in the nation and 2nd in the state of Tennessee for bar passage.

In 2022, the bar passage rate for first time test-takers was 82.5%, ranking 3rd out of 5 ranked programs in Tennessee.

Costs 
Tuition costs for the 2022-2023 school year is $48,660, with 49% of students receiving scholarships. Belmont Law ranks #104 in terms of highest tuition among full-time law students based on 283 tuition rates from 194 law schools, with in-state tuition counting separately.

Board of Advocacy Achievements

References 

Law schools in Tennessee
Belmont University
2011 establishments in Tennessee